Minuscule 260 (in the Gregory-Aland numbering), ε 369 (Soden), is a Greek minuscule manuscript of the New Testament, on parchment. Palaeographically it has been assigned to the 13th century. It has marginalia.

Description 

The codex contains the text of the four Gospels on 241 parchment leaves. The text is written in one column per page, in 24 lines per page.

There is also a division according to the smaller Ammonian Sections (in Μark 241 Sections – the last in 16:20), with references to the Eusebian Canons (written below Ammonian Section numbers).

According to Scrivener the manuscript is correctly written.

Text 

The Greek text of the codex is a representative of the Byzantine text-type. Hermann von Soden classified it to the textual family Kx. Aland placed it in Category V.
According to the Claremont Profile Method it represents textual family Kx in Luke 1 and Luke 20.

History 

The manuscript once belonged to "domini du Fresne" (as codex 309. The manuscripts 260-469 were added to the list of New Testament manuscripts by Scholz (1794-1852). It was examined and described by Scholz and Paulin Martin. C. R. Gregory saw the manuscript in 1884.

The manuscript is currently housed at the Bibliothèque nationale de France (Gr. 51) at Paris.

See also 

 List of New Testament minuscules
 Biblical manuscript
 Textual criticism

References

Further reading 

 Jean-Pierre-Paul Martin, Description technique des manuscrits grecs, relatif au Nouveau Testament, conservé dans les bibliothèques des Paris (Paris 1883), p. 53

Greek New Testament minuscules
13th-century biblical manuscripts
Bibliothèque nationale de France collections